Leo Rajendram Antony (18 April 1927 − 3 December 2012) was a Sri Lankan Roman Catholic bishop.

He studied at St Patrick's College, Jaffna, for nearly nine years (1940–1948). He was ordained as a priest in 1954 and served at the Nallur Mission and then was selected to serve the bishop of Trinco/Batticolo as his secretary. Later he returned to Jaffna and was appointed as a director of the Rosarian Ashram in Thologatty.

In 1966, he was appointed to the cathedral as a pastor and from there was chosen to the auxiliary bishop of Jaffna in 1968.

He was appointed Co-adjutor Bishop of Trinco-Batticolo in December 1972 and succeeded his bishop at Batticolo in 1974. Due to ill health he retired in 1983.

References

1927 births
2012 deaths
20th-century Roman Catholic bishops in Sri Lanka
Alumni of St. Patrick's College, Jaffna
Roman Catholic bishops of Trincomalee